The 1958–59 NBA Season was the 13th season of the National Basketball Association. The season ended with the Boston Celtics winning the NBA Championship (the first of what would be 8 straight), beating the Minneapolis Lakers 4 games to 0 in the NBA Finals.

Notable occurrences 
 The 1959 NBA All-Star Game was played in Detroit, Michigan, with the West beating the East 124–108. Bob Pettit of the St. Louis Hawks and Elgin Baylor of the Minneapolis Lakers share the game's MVP award.
 The Boston Celtics set the record for the most points scored by a team in regulation, in their 173–139 victory over the Minneapolis Lakers.

Final standings

Eastern Division

Western Division

x – clinched playoff spot

Playoffs

Statistics leaders

Note: Prior to the 1969–70 season, league leaders in points, rebounds, and assists were determined by totals rather than averages.

NBA awards
Most Valuable Player: Bob Pettit, St. Louis Hawks
Rookie of the Year: Elgin Baylor, Minneapolis Lakers

All-NBA First Team:
F – Elgin Baylor, Minneapolis Lakers
F – Bob Pettit, St. Louis Hawks
C – Bill Russell, Boston Celtics
G – Bob Cousy, Boston Celtics
G – Bill Sharman, Boston Celtics

All-NBA Second Team:
F – Paul Arizin, Philadelphia Warriors
F – Cliff Hagan, St. Louis Hawks
C – Dolph Schayes, Syracuse Nationals
G – Richie Guerin, New York Knicks
G – Slater Martin, St. Louis Hawks

References
1958–59 NBA Season Summary basketball-reference.com. Retrieved March 30, 2010.